John J. Morrissey (December 30, 1856 – April 29, 1884) was an American Major League Baseball player from Janesville, Wisconsin, who played third base for the  Buffalo Bisons.  His Major League career lasted 12 games over the course of 13 days.  From May 2 to May 12, he batted 47 times, collected 10 hits for a .213 batting average.  In the field, he committed five errors for a .865 fielding percentage.  His brother Tom Morrissey also played Major League Baseball.

Morrissey died of consumption (tuberculosis) in his hometown of Janesville, and is interred at Mount Olivet Cemetery.

References

External links

1856 births
1884 deaths
Major League Baseball third basemen
Baseball players from Wisconsin
19th-century baseball players
Buffalo Bisons (NL) players
19th-century deaths from tuberculosis
Sportspeople from Janesville, Wisconsin
Janesville Mutual players
Binghamton Crickets (1870s) players
Manchester (minor league baseball) players
Albany (minor league baseball) players
Nationals of Washington players
Tuberculosis deaths in Wisconsin